Volzhskaya tower, or Arsenalnaya tower, is one of the three surviving towers of the fortifications of the Zemlyanoy town (posad) of Yaroslavl. Initially, in the 16th century, six gated towers and twenty blank wooden towers were built on the ramparts.

History 
The tower was built of brick between 1658 and 1669 on the right bank of the Volga River. It has a square floor plan and contains a gateway. It served as the main entrance to the fortified part of the city from the water. Originally it had a barbican. Later, the city arsenal was set up in the tower.
At the beginning of the 19th century, the barbican was dismantled.

By the end of the 19th century, the Volga Tower was adapted for a tavern, which was called “The Tower”. Currently, there is a café on the ground floor.

Notes

References 
 Баршевская И. И. Старые дома рассказывают: прогулки по Волжской набережной — Ярославль: Ремдер, 2005. 
 Ваш гид по Ярославлю и Ярославской области: путеводитель. — Ярославль: Верхняя Волга, 2015. 
 Соколова Т. Волжские ворота старого Ярославля  // Северный край. — 2011. — № 83 (14 мая).

Cultural heritage monuments of federal significance in Yaroslavl Oblast
Towers in Russia
Yaroslavl
Buildings and structures completed in 1669
1669 establishments in Russia